Akkacheyude Kunjuvava is a 1985 Indian Malayalam film, directed by Sajan. The film stars Shobhana, Jose Prakash, Ratheesh and Lalu Alex in the lead roles. The film has musical score by Johnson.

Cast

Ratheesh as Prasanthan 
Shobhana
Uma Banerji
Jose Prakash
Lalu Alex as Jayarajan
Baby Shalini as Chacky Mol
Mala Aravindan
T. G. Ravi
Thilakan
V. D. Rajappan
Prathapachandran
Balan K. Nair
Master Boban
Meena
P. K. Abraham
Ranipadmini
Sumithra
Thodupuzha Vasanthi

Soundtrack

References

External links
 

1985 films
1980s Malayalam-language films
Films directed by Sajan